Sebastian Schweizer (born 30 June 1980) is a German curler.

At the national level, he is a three-time German men's champion curler (2003, 2015, 2016).

At the international level, he is a 2011 European mixed silver medallist.

Teams

Men's

Mixed

References

External links

Video: 

Living people
1980 births
German male curlers
German curling champions
21st-century German people